"Hot Damn" is the lead single by Clipse from the Neptunes's compilation album Clones. The song also appears from their debut studio album, Lord Willin' titled as "Cot Damn".

Charts

References

2003 singles
Clipse songs
Arista Records singles
Song recordings produced by the Neptunes
Songs written by Pusha T
Songs written by Pharrell Williams
Songs written by Chad Hugo
2003 songs
Star Trak Entertainment singles
Jazz rap songs